Raúl Edgardo Allard Neumann is a Chilean scholar and politician who has been intendant, councilman and head of the Pontifical Catholic University of Valparaíso (PUCV) during the 1968 democratic reform process. He also served as undersecretary of education during Patricio Aylwin's government.

Neumann is a professor of international relations at the PUCV and author of publications in his country and abroad, he did his postgraduate studies in the US. From 1968 to 1973, Allard Neumann headed the PUCV university reform process as rector and, simultaneously, he was alderman (councillor) of Vina del Mar.

Allard Neumann worked for twelve years at the OAS, where he became executive secretary of education, science and culture. Similarly, he carried out managerial duties or in representation of Chile in Asia-Pacific Economic Cooperation (APEC), Unesco or Educational Mercosur. He was also undersecretary of education, national director of customs and intendant of Valparaíso during Ricardo Lagos' government.

Biography

Early life
In 1961, he obtained his BA in laws at the PUCV. Then, he continued his postgraduate studies after obtaining scholarships from Ford and Parvin foundations (Princeton) or from Fulbright (Southern Methodist).

As PUCV head: 1968−1973
In the 1968 PUCV head elections, Allard Neumann faced Alberto Vial and received support from the President Eduardo Frei Montalva (Christian Democratic Party).

Late life
On 16 October 2018, Allard Neuman was honoured by the Senate of Chile.

References

External links
 PUCV profile

Pontifical Catholic University of Valparaíso alumni
Princeton University alumni
Christian Democratic Party (Chile) politicians
Heads of universities in Chile
Heads of the Pontifical Catholic University of Valparaíso
Year of birth missing (living people)
Living people